F. Kenneth Iverson (September 18, 1925 – April 14, 2002) was an American businessman.  He is credited with transforming Nucor Steel from a nearly bankrupt company in the 1960s into the largest and most successful steelmaker in the United States. Nucor was formed from the Nuclear Corporation of America, which grew out of Reo Motor Company. Ken Iverson joined Nuclear Corporation in 1962 when it bought Vulcraft, a manufacturer of steel joists, where he worked. Iverson quickly rose to president in 1965. 

Trained as a metallurgist, he became a successful leader and businessman.  His management philosophy has been used as a model for other companies around the world.

Management philosophy 
Iverson vigorously advocated a lean management staff, decentralized decision-making structure, and egalitarian work environment.  At Nucor, he brought the number of levels of management down to four - a janitor was literally four promotions away from the CEO's job.  Furthermore, he located the corporate headquarters far away from any production facilities and gave each mill great leeway in its own marketing and production decisions.  Under his leadership, Nucor did away with executive perks such as reserved parking spaces and special health benefits, and Iverson is known to have personally answered his own phone whenever he was in the corporate office - where a staff of 22 was sufficient for managing the entire multi-billion dollar corporation.

Iverson wrote a book about his business philosophy, Plain Talk: Lessons from a Business Maverick (Iverson with Varian, 1997). He graduated from Cornell University in 1946.

Achievements and awards 
Iverson was inducted into the inaugural class of the American Metal Market Steel Hall of Fame  for his work that revolutionized the dynamics of steel production in the 20th century as fully as Sir Henry Bessemer had done in the 19th century. Andrew Carnegie and Ken Iverson were the only members of the inaugural class that were elected by a unanimous vote. He was elected to the National Academy of Engineering in 1994 and received the National Medal of Technology and Innovation in 1991.

References
UCLA School of Business Management profile

External links
 Oral history interview with Kenneth Iverson from Oral Histories of the American South

American chief executives of manufacturing companies
Cornell University alumni
National Medal of Technology recipients
1925 births
2002 deaths